The flag of the Valencian Community  and of the city of Valencia, known as Reial Senyera ("Royal Senyera"), is the traditional Senyera, composed of four red bars on a yellow background, crowned with a blue strip party per pale next to the hoist with a quarter of the total length. It was adopted on 1 July 1982.

It is an historical derivation of the Senyera, the heraldic symbol of the Crown of Aragon, also used today with few variations in all the former kingdoms and counties which were a part of this crown.

History of the flag 
As many other flags of medieval origin, the Senyera, or "" (royal ensign), was used in those years as the arms of the King of Aragon. While not existing still in the Middle Ages, the concept of national flag as understood  today, the true symbol of the nationality was constituted on the royal shield. 

 
It is traditionally considered that a Senyera was granted by James I of Aragon as the arms of Valencia following the Christian conquest from Moorish rule in 1238, although the earliest sources related to this are dated in 1377, when the City Council agreed to replace the old arms used for seals with a new one with the Senyera. While the origins of the usage of the Senyera as a coat of arms remain unclear in the agreement, a crown in the helm and two "L" as supporters were added, according to an honour awarded by Peter IV of Aragon for the loyalty and courage shown by Valencians to him in several wars such as the War of the Two Peters against the Kingdom of Castile.

This Valencian coat of arms began to be used in textile standard as a pennon, including the crown in a fringe, although the blue colour was slightly different. The latter is one of the two shapes used and officially regulated today, together with the rectangle, for Valencian municipalities.

The only currently preserved pennon, commonly considered a  copy of the original, was made in the 17th century and is kept, though very damaged, at the City Historical Archive of Valencia.

Flag protocol
The flag of Valencia is to be hoisted both outside and inside  of each and every public and civil building of the Valencian Community, without endangering the prominence and most honorable place of the Flag of Spain. It has to be hoisted at the right of the National flag (left from viewer's point). The Flag of Valencia can't be bigger than the Flag of Spain nor smaller than the flags of other entities.

Historical flags

Political Flags

Gallery

See also 
 Coat of arms of the Valencian Community
 Flags of the autonomous communities of Spain

References

External links 

 Spanish Vexillological Society on the Valencian flag Spanish Only
 Organic Law of the valencian Statute Spanish only
 Catalan vexilological society on the Valencian flag Spanish only
 butronmaker.blogspot.com Historic images

Senyera Real
 Flag
Valencia
Valencian